Nexus Koramangala  is a shopping mall located on Hosur Road in Koramangala, Bangalore, Karnataka, India developed by Prestige Group. It is the first shopping mall in the city of Bangalore.

Nexus Koramangala is the oldest full-fledged mall in Bangalore with a multi-story book store, 12 cinema halls and other entertainment facilities. The mall is an attraction for tourists. The shopping mall houses  of shops over five levels. A major attraction at the mall is the multiplex, PVR.

Entertainment and leisure
 Retail Shops over 5 floors
 PVR Cinemas 
 The Transit Lounge Food court. 
 It also houses the first McDonald's outlet in Bangalore, along with  KFC at food area, and several other food and beverage outlets.

Gallery

See also
The Forum Vijaya (Shopping Mall)
List of shopping malls in India
List of shopping malls in Bangalore

References

Shopping malls in Bangalore
1999 establishments in Karnataka
Shopping malls established in 1999
20th-century architecture in India